Sir Peter Scott Noble (17 October 1899 – 12 May 1987) was a British academic who was principal of King's College London from 1952 to 1968 and later vice-chancellor of the University of London from 1961 to 1964.

Education
Noble was educated at Fraserburgh Academy, Scotland, followed by University of Aberdeen and then St John's College, Cambridge, where he graduated with a double first in classics and Oriental language. He was made a fellow of St John's College, Cambridge.

Career
Noble was a lecturer in Latin at Liverpool University from 1926 to 1930. He then became professor of Latin language and literature at the University of Leeds from 1930 to 1938 and then Regius Professor of Humanity at the University of Aberdeen from 1938 to 1952. He served as principal of King's College London from 1952 to 1968. He was joint editor of Kharosthi Inscriptions.

Personal life
In 1928 he married Mary Stephen (died 1983) and they had two sons and one daughter. He was knighted on 1 January 1967.

See also
 List of Vice-Chancellors of the University of London

References

1899 births
1987 deaths
Alumni of St John's College, Cambridge
Fellows of St John's College, Cambridge
Alumni of the University of Aberdeen
Academics of the University of Leeds
Academics of the University of Aberdeen
Academics of the University of Liverpool
Principals of King's College London
People educated at Fraserburgh Academy